QNu Labs (or QuNu Labs Private Limited) is a cybersecurity company headquartered in Bengaluru, India. It is credited to be the first firm in India to successfully develop commercial cybersecurity products using quantum physics. It has a subsidiary called QNu Labs Inc, which was set up in Massachusetts, US in 2019.

The company was founded in 2016 by Sunil Gupta, Srinivasa Rao Aluri, Mark Mathias, and Anil Prabhakar. It was incubated at Indian Institute of Technology-Madras and later began operations in Bengaluru.

After conducting field trials for its quantum key distribution product, QNu Labs received support from Cisco Launchpad in 2018. Subsequently, it launched two products—a quantum key distributor called Armos and a quantum random number generator called Tropos—for national and international markets in 2020.

References

External links 
 Company Website
 DRDO tests quantum key distribution tech for secure communication between two facilities
 Budget 2020 announces Rs 8,000 crore national mission on quantum technologies and applications
 India’s billion-dollar quantum push
 The Race Is On

Quantum cryptography
Indian companies established in 2016
Companies based in Karnataka
Technology companies of India
Technology companies established in 2016